Fearne may refer to:

Given name:
Elizabeth Fearne Bonsall (1861–1956), American painter and illustrator
Fearne Cotton (born 1981), English broadcaster and author
Fearne Ewart (born 1936), British former swimmer

Surname:
Aaron Fearne, Australian basketball coach and former professional player
Charles Fearne (1742–1794), English jurist
Chris Fearne MP (born 1963), Maltese physician and politician
Thomas Fearne (1846–1901), farmer and politician

See also
Holly & Fearne Go Dating, British reality TV show first broadcast in 2007
Fearn (disambiguation)
Ferne (disambiguation)